The Royal Naval Biography was written by Lieutenant John Marshall, RN, between 1823 and 1835.

Volumes
Volumes: 	
1823 	Vol. 1, part 1 • Vol. 1. part 2
1824 	Vol. 2, part 1
1825 	Vol. 2, part 2
1827 	Supplement, part 1
1828 	Supplement, part 2
1829 	Supplement, part 3
1830 	Supplement, part 4
1831 	Vol. 3, part 1
1832 	Vol. 3, part 2
1833 	Vol. 4, part 1
1835 	Vol. 4, part 2

Copyright
The entire work is in the public domain and is available in Wikisource.

References

Books about the Royal Navy